Le Monde is a French daily afternoon newspaper. It is the main publication of Le Monde Group and reported an average circulation of 323,039 copies per issue in 2009, about 40,000 of which were sold abroad. It has had its own website since 19 December 1995, and is often the only French newspaper easily obtainable in non-French-speaking countries. It is considered one of the French newspapers of record, along with Libération, and Le Figaro. It should not be confused with the monthly publication Le Monde diplomatique, of which Le Monde has 51% ownership, but which is editorially independent. A Reuters Institute poll in 2021 in France found that "Le Monde is the most trusted national newspaper".

Le Monde was founded by Hubert Beuve-Méry at the request of Charles de Gaulle (as Chairman of the Provisional Government of the French Republic) on 19 December 1944, shortly after the Liberation of Paris, and published continuously since its first edition.

The paper's journalistic side has a collegial form of organization, in which most journalists are not only tenured, but financial stakeholders in the enterprise as well, and participate in the elections of upper management and senior executives. In the 1990s and 2000s, La Vie-Le Monde Group expanded under editor Jean-Marie Colombani with a number of acquisitions. However, its profitability was not sufficient to cover the large debt loads it took on to fund this expansion, and it sought new investors in 2010 to keep the company out of bankruptcy. In June 2010, investors Matthieu Pigasse, Pierre Bergé, and Xavier Niel acquired a controlling stake in the newspaper.

In contrast to other world newspapers such as The New York Times, Le Monde was traditionally focused on offering analysis and opinion, as opposed to being a newspaper of record. Hence, it was considered less important for the paper to offer maximum coverage of the news than to offer thoughtful interpretation of current events. For instance, on the 10th anniversary of the sinking of the Rainbow Warrior, the newspaper directly implicated François Mitterrand, who was the French president at the time, in the operation. In recent years, the paper has established a greater distinction between fact and opinion.

History 

Le Monde was founded in 1944, at the request of General Charles de Gaulle, after the German army had been driven from Paris during World War II. The paper took over the headquarters and layout of Le Temps, which had been the most important newspaper in France, but its reputation had suffered during the Occupation. Beuve-Méry reportedly demanded total editorial independence as the condition for his taking on the project.

In December 2006, on the 60th anniversary of its publishing début, Le Monde moved into new headquarters in Boulevard Auguste-Blanqui, 13th arrondissement of Paris. The building—formerly the headquarters of Air France—was refashioned by Bouygues from the designs of Christian de Portzamparc. The building's façade has an enormous fresco adorned by doves (drawn by Plantu) flying towards Victor Hugo, symbolising freedom of the press.

In 2008, Le Monde was found guilty of defamation for saying that Spanish football club FC Barcelona was connected to a doctor involved in steroid use. The Spanish court fined the newspaper nearly $450,000.

In April 2016, two Le Monde reporters were denied visas to visit Algeria as part of the French Prime Minister press convoy to Algeria. The denial of visas to Le Monde reporters caused some French media to boycott the event, including Libération, Le Figaro, and France Inter. Le Monde had previously published the names of Algerian officials directly involved with the Panama Papers scandal. Coverage of the scandal in Le Monde included a front-page photo of President of Algeria Abdelaziz Bouteflika. However, the paper clarified in its next edition that Bouteflika was not directly implicated, but maintained that his associates were. Bouteflika opened a libel suit against Le Monde, which was later dropped after the newspaper apologised.

In 2014, Groupe Le Monde announced that Le Monde would move into a new headquarters, also in the 13th arrondissement, around 2017, with space for 1,200 people.

Ownership
In June 2010, investors Matthieu Pigasse, Pierre Bergé, and Xavier Niel acquired a controlling stake in the newspaper. In October 2018, staff learned that Pigasse had sold 49% of his stake in the company to Czech businessman Daniel Křetínský. Le Mondes Independency Group, a minority shareholder that aims to protect the paper's editorial independence, had not been informed of the sale, and asked Pigasse and Křetínský to sign an "approval agreement" that would give the Independency Group the right to approve or reject any controlling shareholder. , they had not done so.

Publication schedule
Le Monde is published around midday, and the cover date on the masthead is the following day's. For instance, the issue released at midday on 15 March shows 16 March on the masthead. It is available on newsstands in France on the day of release, and received by mail subscribers on the masthead date. The Saturday issue is a double one, for Saturday and Sunday.

Thus the latest edition can be found on newsstands from Monday to Friday included, while subscribers will receive it from Tuesday to Saturday included.

 LeMonde.fr 
Le Monde was among the first French newspapers on the web, with its first web edition on 19 December 1995. It is among the 50 most visited websites in France.

Starting in the 2000s Le Monde allowed its subscribers to publish a blog on its website. These blogs were called the "les blogs abonnées du Monde.fr". On 10 April 2019, Le Monde announced that it would be closing its blog platform on 5 June 2019. Although the reasons for the closing of the blogs were unclear, it could be linked to the dominance of social networks like Facebook.

Le Monde launched an English language edition of its news website on 7 April 2022, featuring its articles translated from French.

 Politics 

In 1981, Le Monde backed the election of socialist François Mitterrand, partly on the grounds that the alternation of the political party in government would be beneficial to the democratic character of the state. The paper endorsed centre-right candidate Édouard Balladur in the 1995 presidential election, and Ségolène Royal, the Socialist Party candidate, in the 2007 presidential election.

 Reception 

According to the Mitrokhin Archive investigators, Le Monde (KGB codename VESTNIK, "messenger") was the KGB's key outlet for Soviet disinformation in the French media. The archive identified two senior Le Monde journalists and several contributors who were used in the operations (see also the article on Russian influence operations in France).

Michel Legris, a former journalist with the paper, wrote Le Monde tel qu'il est (Le Monde as it is) in 1976. According to him, the journal minimized the atrocities committed by the Cambodian Khmer Rouge.

In their 2003 book titled La Face cachée du Monde (The Hidden face of "Le Monde"), authors Pierre Péan and Philippe Cohen alleged that Colombani and then-editor Edwy Plenel had shown, amongst other things, partisan bias and had engaged in financial dealings that compromised the paper's independence. It also accused the paper of dangerously damaging the authority of the French state by having revealed various political scandals (notably corruption scandals surrounding Jacques Chirac, the "Irish of Vincennes" affair, and the sinking of a Greenpeace boat, the Rainbow Warrior, by French intelligence under President François Mitterrand). This book remains controversial, but attracted much attention and media coverage in France and around the world at the time of its publication. Following a lawsuit, the authors and the publisher agreed in 2004 not to proceed to any reprinting.

Directors
 Hubert Beuve-Méry (1944–1969)
 Jacques Fauvet (1969–1981)
 Claude Julien (1981–1982)
 André Laurens (1982–1985)
 André Fontaine (1985–1991)
 Jacques Lesourne (1991–1994)
 Jean-Marie Colombani (1994–2007)
 Éric Fottorino (2007–2010)
 Érik Izraelewicz (2011–2012)
 Alain Frachon (2012–2013)
 Natalie Nougayrède (2013–2014)
 Jérôme Fenoglio (2014–)

Recent circulation history

Prix littéraire du Monde
The Prix littéraire du Monde''' has been awarded annually by Le Monde since 2013. It is awarded at the beginning of September to a novel published at the start of the French literary season—or "rentrée littéraire". The winner of the prize is chosen by a jury made up of journalists—literary journalists from Le Monde des livres, cultural or other editorial staff—chaired by the director of the newspaper.

Winners

See also

 List of French newspapers
 Libération El País, newspaper in Spain inspired by Le Monde Jean-Louis de Rambures, journalist
 Henri Pierre, journalist

 Notes 

References

Further reading
 Merrill, John C. and Harold A. Fisher. The world's great dailies: profiles of fifty newspapers'' (1980) pp 202–10

External links

  
 

1944 establishments in France
French news websites
Centre-left newspapers
Daily newspapers published in France
Liberal media in France
Liberal socialism
Newspapers published in Paris
Publications established in 1944
Social democratic media